Paul LeBaron Thiebaud (October 10, 1960 – June 19, 2010) was an American art dealer who owned two influential galleries, one in New York City and the other in San Francisco. He exhibited the work of a host of lesser-known artists whom he felt it was his role to bring to a wider public audience, in addition to the work of his father, the noted pop painter Wayne Thiebaud.

His elder sister is the actress, model, and writer Twinka Thiebaud; his mother Betty is a filmmaker; and his brother Matthew is an artist as well. He had a wife, Karen, and two daughters. He died of colon cancer on June 19, 2010, at the age of 49.

References

External links
Obituary
The Paul Thiebaud Gallery Website

1960 births
2010 deaths
American art collectors
American art dealers
20th-century American businesspeople
People from Sacramento, California
Deaths from colorectal cancer